Trùng Khánh is a district (huyện) of Cao Bằng province in the Northeast region of Vietnam.

As of 2020 the district had a population of 70,424. The district covers an area of 688.01 km². The district capital lies at Trùng Khánh.

The district is famous for its Chinese chestnut.

Administrative divisions
Trùng Khánh district is subdivided to 21 commune-level subdivisions, including the townships of Hùng Quốc, Trùng Khánh and the rural communes of: Cao Chương, Cao Thăng, Chí Viễn, Đàm Thủy, Đình Phong, Đoài Dương, Đức Hồng, Khâm Thành, Lăng Hiếu, Ngọc Côn, Ngọc Khê, Phong Châu, Phong Nặm, Quang Hán, Quang Trung, Quang Vinh, Tri Phương, Trung Phúc, Xuân Nội.

References

Districts of Cao Bằng province